Mombo Airstrip  is an airstrip in  northeastern Tanzania in the Korogwe District of the Tanga Region of Tanzania.

See also

 List of airports in Tanzania
 Transport in Tanzania

References

External links
OpenStreetMap - Mombo Airport
Tanzania Airports Authority
OurAirports - Mombo Airport

Airstrips in Tanzania
Buildings and structures in the Tanga Region